The , officially the 2017 All Japan Adults Football Tournament, and most known as the 2017 Shakaijin Cup,  was the 53rd edition of the annually contested single-elimination tournament (or cup) for non-league clubs.

Calendar

Source:

Schedule

Round of 32

Round of 16

Quarter-finals

Semi-finals

Third place match

Final

References

External links
About the tournament

See also
2017 J1 League
2017 J2 League
2017 J3 League
2017 Japanese Regional Leagues
2017 Emperor's Cup
2017 J.League Cup

2017 in Japanese football